Sanjay Bhoi is an Indian politician from Odisha in India. He was an MP from the Bargarh (Lok Sabha constituency),of Odisha in India, on the ticket of Indian National Congress in the general election of 2009.

Early life and education 
Sanjay was born in a village Paikmal in Baragarh, son of Krupasindhu Bhoi, four times MP from Sambalpur. He is a qualified IT professional (Microsoft Certified Product Specialist) and has done his education in Delhi University. He worked in a multinational software company as a project manager for six years and returned to Orissa after his father's death. He is a grass roots leader and has organised several social service projects in his district. He has also organised cultural functions to highlight the backward region of western Orissa. He is also working to prevent starvation deaths in Orissa.

Political career 
An IT professional by education Sanjay was chosen by congress party to contest Lok Sabha election from Bargarh in 2009. He defeated his nearest rival Radharani Panda of Bharatiya Janata Party by over one lakh votes.
He was 3rd in 2014 Lok sabha election from Bargarh (Lok Sabha constituency)

See also
 Bargarh (Lok Sabha constituency)
 Indian general election in Orissa, 2009
 Indian National Congress

References

External links 
 Detailed Profile: Shri Sanjay Bhoi at Indian Government portal

Odisha politicians
Indian National Congress politicians
India MPs 2009–2014
People from Bargarh district
Living people
Lok Sabha members from Odisha
Year of birth missing (living people)
Indian National Congress politicians from Odisha